The Babil Governorate elections resulted in the election of 41 members of the Provincial Council (PC). The results are presented in the following table and the parenthesis indicates the position selected by the PC after their first meetings.

Results

Composition of council

See also
 2005 Iraqi governorate elections
 Governorate council elections

Governorate elections in Iraq
2005 elections in Iraq